Nicholas Ralph Tomlinson  (1803-1842) was a British Army Infantry Officer who Commanded Her Majesty's 18th (Royal Irish) Regiment of Foot during the First Anglo-Chinese War (First Opium War). He was the second son of Vice Admiral Nicholas Tomlinson and his wife Elizabeth who lived in the county of Essex.

Nicholas Ralph Tomlinson's military career was recorded in Hart's Military Directory and other military gazettes as follows:

Commissioned as an Ensign in 18th Regiment of Foot - 22 March 1821
Promoted to Lieutenant - 21 July 1825
Promoted to Captain - 8 February 1833
Promoted to Major - 13 March 1840
Promoted to Lieutenant Colonel - 23 November 1841.

Nicholas Tomlinson deployed with his regiment as part of Lieutenant General Sir Hugh Gough's force to subdue the Imperial Qing Chinese Forces resisting East India Company trading access to coastal China. The Chinese forces were numerous but often poorly equipped.

He would fight with distinction at the following engagements:

Capture of Chusan in July 1840
Battle of Canton in May 1841
Battle of Amoy in August 1841
Second Capture of Chusan in October 1841
Battle of Ningpo in March 1842
Battle of Tzeki in March 1842.

Lieutenant Colonel Tomlinson was killed leading his regiment at the Battle of Chapu on 2 May 1842, specifically an attack on a fortified religious building (called a Joss House by the British), which was heavily defended by Tartar soldiers. Sir Hugh Gough wrote effusively about the bravery of Nicholas Tomlinson and that he was buried at sea. His death and the death of others of his regiment is commemorated with a memorial in St Patrick's Cathedral Dublin. The 18th of foot would lose their commanding officer, a serjeant and three soldiers killed; and a further two officers, a serjeant, a drummer and 27 soldiers wounded - the 18th had the highest casualties of any of the regiments in action that day at Chapu.

Gallery

References

1803 births
1842 deaths
Royal Irish Regiment (1684–1922) officers
British military personnel of the First Opium War